Jayme is a unisex given name and a surname which may refer to:

Given name:
 Jayme Alaric de Perpignan, ambassador from Pope Clement IV and James I of Aragon to the Mongol ruler Abaqa Khan in 1267
 Jayme de Almeida (born 1953), Brazilian football assistant coach and former player and manager
 Jayme Lynn Blaschke (born 1969), American journalist and author
 Jayme Caetano Braun (1924–1999), Brazilian folk musician, poet and composer
 Jayme Cramer (born 1983), American swimmer
 Jayme Garfinkel (born 1945), Brazilian billionaire, Chairman of the Board and CEO of Porto Seguro Seguros, a large insurance company
 Jayme Lawson (born 2001), American actress
 Jayme Mitchell (born 1984), American former football player
 Jayme Richardson (born 1989), Australian Paralympic cyclist
 Jayme Stone (}, Canadian banjoist, composer and producer
 Jayme Luiz Szwarcfiter (born 1942), Brazilian computer scientist
 Jayme Tiomno (1920–2011), Brazilian physicist

Surname:
 Antonio Ledesma Jayme (1854-1937), Filipino lawyer, revolutionary, Governor of Negros Occidental and assemblyman
 Carlos Jayme (born 1980), Brazilian retired swimmer
 Erik Jayme (born 1934), Canadian-born German law professor
 Luis Jayme (1740-1775), Spanish Roman Catholic priest, missionary in America and martyr

See also
 Jaymee Joaquin (born 1985), Filipina actress, model and game show host
 Jamie, a given name
 Jaymes, a surname

Unisex given names
English unisex given names